Nicholas Mumley, Jr. (January 26, 1937 – September 22, 2022) was an American professional football player who was a tackle for the New York Titans of the American Football League (AFL).  

Mumley was born in Wheeling, West Virginia, and attended Wheeling High School.

He then enrolled at Purdue University where he played college football at the tackle position for the Purdue Boilermakers football team from 1956 to 1957 and 1959. He was selected by the International News Service as a second-team player on its 1957 College Football All-America Team.  

Mumley was selected by the Philadelphia Eagles in the fifth round (51st overall pick) of the 1959 NFL Draft. He opted instead to play for the New York Titans (later renamed the Jets) in the new AFL. He appeared in 42 games, 36 as a starter, as a defensive end from 1960 to 1962.

Mumley died on September 22, 2022, at the age of 85.

References

1937 births
2022 deaths
American football tackles
Purdue Boilermakers football players
New York Titans (AFL) players
Players of American football from West Virginia
Sportspeople from Wheeling, West Virginia